The Lady in Question is a 1999 American television mystery crime-thriller film directed by Joyce Chopra. It represents the last leading role and film for Gene Wilder and his last credit as screenwriter. As in the previous film Murder in a Small Town, Wilder plays the amateur detective Larry "Cash" Carter.  
It was broadcast by A&E on December 12, 1999.

Cast 
 Gene Wilder 	as Larry "Cash" Carter
 Mike Starr	as Det. Tony Rossini
 Cherry Jones as  	Mimi Barnes 
 Barbara Sukowa		as  	Rachel Singer
 John Benjamin Hickey	as  Paul Kessler	 
 Claire Bloom		as 	Emma Sachs
 Michael Cumpsty		as 	Klaus Gruber
 Dixie Seatle as Gertie Moser

Production
After the high ratings A&E received for Murder in a Small Town, the first Cash Carter mystery, The Lady in Question began filming in Toronto in May 1999.

Although A&E and Granada Entertainment USA planned to develop the Gene Wilder character as a franchise, only two Cash Carter films were produced. On January 30, 2000, Wilder was admitted to Memorial Sloan–Kettering Cancer Center for a stem-cell transplant, a follow-up to treatment he received in 1999 for non-Hodgkin lymphoma. Wilder checked in under the name Larry Carter, his character's name in the two A&E films.

Home video releases
 1999, A&E Home Video, VHS (AAE-17606), 
 2002, A&E Home Video, DVD (AAE-72223),

References

External links

 
 The Gene Wilder Papers at the University of Iowa — Scripts and correspondence for The Lady in Question

1999 films
1999 crime thriller films
1990s English-language films
1990s mystery thriller films
A&E (TV network) original films
American detective films
American mystery thriller films
American crime thriller films
American sequel films
American thriller television films
Crime television films
Films directed by Joyce Chopra
Films scored by John Morris
Films set in 1938
Films set in Connecticut
Films shot in Toronto
Films with screenplays by Gene Wilder
Television sequel films
1990s American films